Udea cretacea is a moth in the family Crambidae. It was described by Ivan Nikolayevich Filipjev in 1925. It is found in Georgia and Russia (Caucasus).

References

Moths described in 1925
cretacea